The Adorno traffic light is a traffic light artefact located in Frankfurt and named after Theodor W. Adorno. It has become one of Frankfurt's landmarks. The traffic light is on Senckenberganlage, a street which divides the Institute for Social Research from Goethe University Frankfurt. Adorno requested its construction after a pedestrian death in 1962, and it was finally installed 25 years later.

History

In 1951 the Institute for Social Research moved into a new building on Senckenberganlage. 

On March 12, 1958, Adorno wrote a letter to the University outlining dangers of crossing the street, which led to police chief Gerhard Littmann marking a pedestrian crossing.

On November 29, 1961, Adorno demanded "a bridge for pedestrians over the Senckenberganlage or a diversion of all traffic". 

In 1962 a person was killed in a traffic accident in the Senckenberganlage area, which led to Adorno writing to the Frankfurter Allgemeine Zeitung demanding "traffic lights in the whole university area":

- Theodor W. Adorno 

Adorno's demand was fulfilled 18 years after his death. In 1985 Jürgen Habermas (director of the institute) campaigned for the traffic lights. In 1987, Habermas' successor, Ludwig von Friedeburg, placed a pedestrian traffic light at the Senckenberg plant. The light was named the "Adorno traffic light".

The Adorno traffic light has developed into a tourist attraction in Frankfurt.

Literature

 Michael Maaser : A bridge over the Senckenberganlage. Adorno and the University of Frankfurt . In: Research Frankfurt . No. 3-4 / 2003 , ISSN  0175-0992 , p. 48–51 ( uni-frankfurt.de [PDF; 1.4 MB ; accessed on February 21, 2019]).
 Wolfram Schütte (Ed.): Adorno in Frankfurt. A kaleidoscope with texts and pictures . 1st edition. Suhrkamp, Frankfurt am Main 2003, pp. 236-240: The Adorno traffic light ; P. 241: Frankfurter Rundschau, June 6, 1987: […] traffic light as Adorno memorial .
 Richard Deiss: Adorno traffic light and suspension railway elephant. 222 little traffic anecdotes on everything that moves us . BoD, Norderstedt 2010,  .
 Frank Berger, Christian Setzepfandt : 101 non-locations in Frankfurt . New edition. Societäts-Verlag, Frankfurt am Main 2011,  . [7]
 Stuart Walton: Neglected or Misunderstood. Introducing Theodor Adorno . Zero Books, Winchester (United Kingdom) 2017, pp. 31–32 (English, limited preview in Google Book Search).

References 

Frankfurt
Theodor W. Adorno